Trond Høines (born 10 September 1970) is a Norwegian freestyle swimmer. He was born in Stavanger. He competed at the 1992 Summer Olympics in Barcelona.

References

External links 
 

1970 births
Living people
Sportspeople from Stavanger
Norwegian male freestyle swimmers
Olympic swimmers of Norway
Swimmers at the 1992 Summer Olympics
20th-century Norwegian people